Coney Hatch, Coney Hatch's first album, was released in 1982. A video for the song "Devil's Deck" was produced.  The album was re-issued by British label Rock Candy Records in 2005, including 3 bonus tracks and liner notes by former Kerrang! writer Howard Johnson.

Aldo Nova covered the song "Hey Operator" on his 1983 solo album Subject.

A cover of "Monkey Bars" was recorded by American hard rock band Buster Brown and released on their 1985 album Sign of Victory.

Track listing
 "Devil's Deck" (Carl Dixon/Andy Curran/Steve Shelski) - 4:26 
 "You Ain't Got Me" (Carl Dixon) - 3:36
 "Stand Up" (Carl Dixon/Andy Curran/Steve Shelski/Dave Ketchum) * - 3:32
 "No Sleep Tonight" (Carl Dixon/Andy Curran/Steve Shelski) - 3:22
 "Love Poison" (Carl Dixon/Andy Curran/Steve Shelski) * - 3:44
 "We Got the Night" (Carl Dixon/Andy Curran/Steve Shelski/Dave Ketchum) - 3:08
 "Hey Operator" (Carl Dixon) - 3:17
 "I'll Do the Talkin'" (Andy Curran/Steve Shelski) * - 3:07
 "Victim of Rock" (Carl Dixon) - 3:11
 "Monkey Bars" (Andy Curran/Steve Shelski) * - 4:21
 "Dreamland" (Carl Dixon) - 3:43 [bonus track on 2005 remastered CD]
 "Where I Draw the Line" (Carl Dixon/Andy Curran/Steve Shelski) - 3:54  [Bonus track on 2005 remastered CD - Previously unreleased]
 "Sin After Sin"(Carl Dixon) - 4:00 (demo) [Bonus track on 2005 remastered CD] *

Credits 
 Carl Dixon – rhythm guitar, lead vocals
 Andy Curran – bass guitar, lead vocals * 
 Steve Shelski – lead guitar, vocals
 Dave "Thumper" Ketchum – drums, percussion
Produced by Kim Mitchell 
Executive Producers Michael Tilka and Tom Berry
Recorded at Quest Recording Studios, Oshawa, Ontario
Engineered by Paul LaChapelle
"You Ain't Got Me" recorded at Sound Kitchen Toronto, Ontario
Co-Produced by Jack Richardson
Mixed by Kim Mitchell and Paul LaChapelle at Quest Recording Studio
Photography by David Street
Released internationally through Mercury-PolyGram Records and Casablanca Records (Japan)

1982 debut albums
Coney Hatch albums
Anthem Records albums